Fiona Mary Mont (born 1 April 1970 in Brighton) is an English former fugitive. She became known as "Britain's Most Wanted Woman" during a major police and media hunt for her in connection with allegations of corporate fraud.  The chase lasted for three years and covered a large area of Europe - including the Netherlands, Belgium, France, Spain, Gibraltar, and Portugal.  She was featured on BBC TV Crimewatch and ITV, and newspapers printed various accounts of her possible whereabouts during a three-year period.  She and Graham Hesketh, her partner in flight, were frequently likened to Bonnie and Clyde.

Mont always maintained her innocence. Despite the investigative reporting of the UK press, her whereabouts were unknown throughout the entire period. A Guardian article, in September 2004, alleged she was living in a caravan near Brighton.

Early life
Mont is the daughter of Neville Mont, who was an Under Sheriff of Sussex, and Joan Mont, a former Conservative leader of East Sussex County Council.

She attended secondary school at St. Mary's Hall, Brighton and later attended school in Canada where she lived with relatives during 1986. On her return from Canada, she acquired a job with the Gemini Business Centre.

Arrest and flight
In September 1999 she was arrested.  The officer leading the case was Detective Constable Stephen Skerrett of the Steyning Station of Sussex Police.

Later, her car was found near Beachy Head (an infamous suicide spot).  The Coast Guard mounted a two-day search operation before Mont's mother eventually admitted to receiving a phone call from her.  It was reported that she had fled the country in a light aircraft piloted by Graham Hesketh from Shoreham Airport.  She denied the allegations against her via a website.

Mont was featured on BBC television's Crimewatch in 2000 as wanted for questioning in relation to allegations of £300,000 of computer fraud, which she has always denied.  She later appeared the same year in an ITV production similar to Crimewatch entitled "Britain's Most Wanted": in this programme, DC Skerrett, also a pilot, flew an aircraft for the reconstruction of events.  The following day, the tabloids adopted the title of the programme as a nickname for Mont.

Mont and Hesketh settled in Spain and lived in a small caravan. Hesketh worked as a bricklayer and the couple had their first child, Samantha, in 2001.  Claims were made in the media that she had set up a website to taunt police and that she had sent emails saying 'Catch me if you can'.  She has always denied these allegations.

Capture and escape 
The couple remained at large in Spain until January 2002, when Mont was arrested on the Costa del Sol.  She was taken to Madrid to await extradition proceedings, but when the Spanish authorities released her on bail, she vanished again.

The Guardian reported in 2004 that the couple's son, Benjamin, was born at Worthing hospital in late 2003, and that since Skerrett's departure from the police force much of the interest in closing the file on the fraud has gone.

The case against Mont was eventually dropped - a joint decision by the Police and Crown Prosecution Service, according to a spokesman for the force.

Lawsuits
Graham Hesketh complained to the Press Complaints Commission about the behaviour of the Sunday Mirror.

References

Living people
1970 births
English criminals
Place of birth missing (living people)